Kwok Cheuk-kin (born 29 April 1940) is a Hong Kong retired civil servant and judicial activist who earned the nickname of "King of Judicial Reviews" for having filed dozens of judicial reviews against the government in 16 years.

Early life 
Kwok's father was an officer in the National Revolutionary Army of the Republic of China. Kwok stayed in Chungking during the Japanese occupation of Hong Kong, and returned after Japan surrendered in 1945. After studying in Shaukeiwan for primary school and at Catholic Ming Yuen Secondary School in Rennie's Mill, Kwok went to National Taiwan University and graduated with Bachelor of Laws. Kwok then worked in Hong Kong's judiciary.

In 1989, Kwok travelled to Beijing to support pro-democracy movement, but was arrested in Beijing on 7 June after the bloody crackdown, later detained in Shanghai for a year. According to Kwok, he was given the British nationality following recommendation by the Hong Kong Government, which also advised him to leave Hong Kong. Kwok, however, said he hasn't thought of migration, instead moved to Bela Vista Villa of outlying island Cheung Chau for retirement in 1996.

Judicial activism 
Aiming to strive for justice and fight for Cheung Chau residents, Kwok applied his first judicial review (JR) in 2006 against the approval by Transport Department for fare hike of Cheung Chau ferry route. He then applied JR over incineration plant project on Shek Kwu Chau, illegal hillside burial on Cheung Chau, and other Cheung Chau-related issues. Kwok then expanded the scope on JR to city-wide with government's legal aid services.

In 2017 Kwok said he believed Hong Kong no longer enjoyed rule of law and is planning to migrate to Britain. The same year Kwok was barred from applying for legal aid over the next three years, after the authorities considered his conduct amounted to an abuse of the legal aid system. However Kwok eventually stayed and continued his activism. In 2020, he was declared bankrupt after losing the JR related to Polytechnic University siege. This, however, did not stop him from challenging government's decisions. In 2022, he achieved a rare success after the High Court ruled the Hong Kong government does not have the power to void more than 20,000 COVID-19 vaccination exemption certificates issued by doctors allegedly handed them out without conducting proper medical consultation, despite the verdict was effectively overturned by the government days later.

Kwok, a former member of Democratic Party, has been under attack from Beijing mouthpieces, accused by Ta Kung Pao of colluding with "anti-China" pro-democracy camp. After sixteen years with over 60 filings of judicial review but winning less than 10 of those, Kwok revealed his intention to end his activism under fear of crackdown and arrest by authorities.

Issues 
Notable city-wide issues Kwok has challenged in court included:

 Denial of HKTV's television license application
 Political reform consultation
 "Leapfrog" mechanism for Legislative Council
 Lead in Drinking Water Incidents
 Ding rights
 Co-location arrangement of Express Rail Link
 Dual nationality of President-elect Andrew Leung of Legislative Council
 Oath of office by Lo Wai-kwok and Regina Ip of Legislative Council
 Invalidation of COVID-19 vaccination exemption certificates
 Mandatory use of LeaveHomeSafe

Electoral performance

References 

Hong Kong pan-democrats
National Taiwan University alumni